Katharina "Kathi" Häckelsmiller (born 27 August 2004) is a German ice hockey player and member of the German national ice hockey team, currently playing in the German Women's Ice Hockey League (DFEL) with ECDC Memmingen.

International career
Häckelsmiller represented Germany in the girls' ice hockey tournament at the 2020 Winter Youth Olympics in Lausanne, Switzerland. She scored one of Germany's three goals in the tournament – the other two goals were tallied by Svenja Voigt.

The 2021 IIHF Women's World Championship in Calgary, Canada served as her debut with the German senior national team. She was the youngest player on the team and played in three of the Germany's six games, not recording any points.

In an upset of the traditional order, Häckelsmiller's German national under-18 team debut came after her first appearance with the senior national team and was made at the 2022 IIHF U18 Women's World Championship in Madison, Wisconsin, United States. She tallied three assists in the tournament, ranking third in scoring for the German team.

Statistics

References

External links
 
 

2004 births
Living people
Ice hockey players at the 2020 Winter Youth Olympics
German women's ice hockey forwards
People from Augsburg (district)
Sportspeople from Swabia (Bavaria)
21st-century German women